Gerald Jones (30 December 1945 – 18 August 2021) was an English footballer who played in the Football League for Stoke City.

Life and career
Jones was born in Middleport, Stoke-on-Trent and began his career with local side Stoke City. He played seven matches for Stoke in three seasons without establishing himself in Tony Waddington's first team and was released in May 1967. He went on to play for non-league sides Stafford Rangers and Macclesfield Town.

Jones died on 18 August 2021, at the age of 75.

Career statistics

References

1945 births
2021 deaths
English footballers
Stoke City F.C. players
Stafford Rangers F.C. players
Macclesfield Town F.C. players
English Football League players
Footballers from Stoke-on-Trent
Association football outside forwards